The Rooms is a settlement near Galeville, Newfoundland and Labrador. Population 60 in 1951 and 58 in 1956.

See also
List of communities in Newfoundland and Labrador

Populated coastal places in Canada
Populated places in Newfoundland and Labrador